Peter Khalil (born 23 March 1973) is an Australian politician and the Labor Member for Wills in the Australian House of Representatives. Prior to entering parliament, Khalil worked as a consultant, the Victorian Multicultural Commissioner, the Director of Strategy at the Special Broadcasting Service, and a national security policy adviser to Prime Minister Kevin Rudd.

Early life, education and tennis 
Khalil's parents migrated to Australia from Egypt in 1970 and their experience has significantly affected his later political outlook, "They were striving to seek a better life in Australia. They were seeking a life of security, and opportunity and prosperity." He gave credit to Bob Hawke for the opportunity his family was given in Australia." As a child, he lived in public housing. After leaving school, Khalil competed on the international tennis circuit and was once ranked No 25 domestically for singles. In 1996 Khalil gained the degrees of BA and LL.B. from the University of Melbourne and in 2001 graduated as a Master of Laws in the field of international law at the Australian National University. He is a Coptic Christian.

Professional life 
Outside of the government service, Khalil has worked as a political risk and strategy consultant to government agencies and the corporate sector. Khalil worked as a policy analyst in the Strategic Policy and Intelligence Group of the Department of Defence, the Director of National Security Policy of the Coalition Provisional Authority in Iraq, and an Assistant Director of the Iraq Task Force of the Department of Foreign Affairs and Trade. He then worked as National Security Adviser to Kevin Rudd as both Leader of the Opposition and Prime Minister in 2007 and as Senior Adviser to Minister for Defence Joel Fitzgibbon in 2008. On the issue of asylum seekers coming to Australia, reports from the US Embassy in 2009 show that Khalil actively advised Rudd to "calmly and rationally put the issue in perspective", specifically "that there were about 60,000 cases of visa over-stayers per year, while only 1000 asylum seekers entered Australian waters by boat by that stage in 2009."

Khalil was a visiting fellow at the Centrist think tank, the Brookings Institution and an Adjunct Associate Professor at the University of Sydney Centre for International Security. While working at the Brookings Institution, Khalil was an informant for the Embassy of the United States about internal Labor Party disputes surrounding refugee policy.

After leaving the private sector, Khalil worked as the Executive Director for Corporate Affairs, Strategy and Communications for the Special Broadcasting Service and as the Victorian Multicultural Commissioner.

Parliamentary service 

Khalil was preselected as the Australian Labor Party candidate for the federal Division of Wills at the 2016 federal election. Khalil's endorsement for the safe seat over Scientist Anna-Maria Arabia raised criticisms that the Australian Labor Party's Affirmative Action targets were being ignored by the Victorian branch. He assumed office as the new member for seat in the 2016 Australian federal election and succeeded the previous member, Kelvin Thomson, and became the first Coptic Christian to be elected to Federal Parliament in Australia. He faced controversy over being labelled as a "war criminal", due to his involvement in the Iraq Task Force. He was re-elected to his seat in the 2019 Australian federal election increasing his primary vote by 6%.

Housing 
Khalil is proud of having been raised in public housing, writing in 2020 of how "affordable housing helped level the playing field, it offered us real equality of opportunity" and "helped me and others rise out of disadvantage." He is critical of federal government that it has allowed the level of public housing stock to slip since the 1990s. Equally, he was critical of state government authorities for the heavy handed lockdown that seemed to target public housing estates in Melbourne in July 2020 would only "entrench disadvantage."

Economy and Energy 
Khalil conforms to classical Labor concerns for Australia, particularly that its "...wages have been stagnant under this government, there’s been underemployment and a lack of investment." However, he was an early supporter of Government tax cuts after the 2019 election. On energy, Khalil has withdrawn support from Adani’s Carmichael coal mine because "it doesn't stack up commercially and environmentally." He sees gas differently, believing that as Australia moves towards a less carbon intensive future, "Gas is a good transitional source."

Multi-ethnic Australia 
From his Parliamentary position, Khalil advocates for a welcoming posture towards immigrants. When an assistant minister for multicultural affairs Jason Wood, suggested that "most migrants when they come here don't know what it means to be Australian, Khalil countered that:Our values of freedom, of equality of opportunity, of a fair go are why new migrants have made and are making a commitment to Australia as their home. This understanding is in fact what has driven the tremendous contributions of millions of migrants who have come to call Australia home...During the early months of the outbreak of Coronavirus, he spoke up for detainees who have cleared security checks, saying, "Releasing them will both protect the physical and mental health of these refugees and asylum seekers, and assist in the nationwide efforts to slow the spread of coronavirus." When an Iranian refugee under Australia's protection, Amir, was blocked from returning to Australia, Khalili's intervention, saw Border Force change its decision.

Global Democracy 
In an article co-written with Michael Danby and Carl Ungerer, Khalil has argued that, "Bowing to Beijing would be the modern equivalent of the Munich Agreement". He went on to argue for a containment of Chinese totalitarian threats to democratic nations, saying: It is in Australia's most vital strategic interest that the US presence in our region is not weakened or undermined. This is not because we seek to thwart China's legitimate aspirations and interests. It's because we are a liberal democracy whose interests are best served by a stable, prosperous region in which all countries evolve towards more democratic forms of government, as is indeed happening, most notably in Indonesia.Khalil was appointed the Deputy Chair to the Joint Standing Committee on Treaties in mid 2019, working alongside Dave Sharma. He has stated himself to be "a very strong supporter of the US alliance." Khalil expresses great concern about the health of global institutions that once could be expected to follow democratic principles. He has been critical of the World Health Organization when it allowed the re-opening of Chinese wet markets, saying he was, "flabbergasted." Recently it's said he has been approached to join Parliamentary Friends of Democracy with fellow Labor colleague Senator Kimberley Kitching and several Coalition figures. Khalil has contributed to The Tocsin  the official publication of the social democratic think tank, John Curtin Research Centre. In May 2020, Khalil joined 20 other Australian parliamentarians, from several parties, in making a statement against the Chinese Communist Party's decision to assume greater over Hong Kong, the message read, in part, "This is a comprehensive assault on the city’s autonomy, rule of law, and fundamental freedoms. The integrity of one-country, two-systems hangs by a thread." In 2022 Khalil was made Australian Co-Chair for the Inter-Parliamentary Alliance on China, a global group who work to ensure that an authoritarian Chinese does not interfere with the governance and principles of the world's democracies.

Awards 
Khalil was awarded the Humanitarian Overseas Service Medal for his service in Iraq.

References

1973 births
Living people
Australian Labor Party members of the Parliament of Australia
Labor Right politicians
Members of the Australian House of Representatives for Wills
Members of the Australian House of Representatives
Australian people of Egyptian descent
Australian people of Coptic descent
21st-century Australian politicians
Australian expatriates in Iraq
Politicians from Melbourne